Myripristis vittata is a soldierfish from the Indo-Pacific.

Description
It grows to a size of 25 centimeters in length or about 9.8 inches.  This species is usually found in small groups and sometimes forms large schools.

Distribution and habitat
Myripristis vittata is recorded to live in the areas of Indo-Pacific, mainly from oceanic islands, from the Mascarene Islands and Seychelles to French Polynesia, and the Hawaiian Islands. Myripristis vittata is found in marine environments within reef-associated areas. They occupy the depth range of about 3 – 80 meters, but more specifically this species stays in the depth range of about 15 – 80 meters. This species is native to a tropical environment. They are recorded to swim upside down occasionally. This species is nocturnal and it feeds on plankton.

Uses
Myripristis vittata occasionally makes its way into the aquarium trade.

References

Notes

External links
 

vittata
Fish of Hawaii
Fish of Palau
Fish described in 1831